The Feeding is the third album by the metal band American Head Charge.

Background 
The Feeding was recorded after a two-year exile, and with the band experiencing internal tumult and personal demons. It is the only album with Bryan Ottoson on guitar. The song "Cowards", appears on the Ultimate Fighting Championship compilation album Ultimate Beatdowns Vol. 1.

Reception 

The Feeding sold over 100,000 copies and received positive reviews.

Track listing

Music videography

Personnel 

 Cameron Heacock - vocals
 Chad Hanks - bass
 Justin Fouler - keyboards, samples
 Bryan Ottoson - guitar
 Chris Emery - drums
 Karma Singh Cheema - guitar

Credits 
 Greg Fidelman - producer, engineer, additional guitar
 Dan Monti - editing, engineer
 Cesar Ramirez - assistant engineer
 Louie Teran - mastering
 Mauro Rubbi - drum tech
 Christine Fiene - project coordinator
 Gary Richards - manager
 Dustin Fildes - cover art
 James Killingsworth - meditation & inspiration

References

External links 
 Official The Feeding album information
 Music video of "Loyalty"

2005 albums
American Head Charge albums
Albums produced by Greg Fidelman